Francisco López or Francisco Lopez may refer to:


Arts 
Francisco López (painter), 16th-century Spanish Renaissance painter
Francisco López (17th-century painter) (1554–1629), Spanish Renaissance painter
Francisco López Capillas (c. 1615–1673), Mexican composer
Francisco López Merino (1904–1928), Argentine poet
Francisco Solano López (comics) (1928–2011), Argentine comics artist
Francisco Benjamín López Toledo (1940–2019), known as Francisco Toledo, Mexican Zapotec painter
Francisco López (musician) (born 1964), Spanish avant-garde musician
Francisco Delgado López (active since 1997), Spanish costume designer who usually goes under the name Paco Delgado

Politicians 
Francisco Solano López (1827–1870), President of Paraguay
Francisco López López (born 1959), Puerto Rican politician and Mayor of Barranquitas
Francisco López Álvarez, more known as Patxi López (born 1959), Spanish politician, President of the Basque Autonomous Community

Sportspeople

Football
Francisco López Contreras (born 1934), Guatemalan footballer
Francisco Javier López García (born 1950), Spanish footballer
Francisco López Alfaro (born 1962), Spanish football player
Paco López (Francisco José López Fernández, born 1967), Spanish football player and manager
Francisco López Grance (born 1987), Paraguayan football forward
Francisco Antonio López (born 1989), Honduran footballer with Platense F.C.

Other sports
Francisco López (handballer) (born 1949), Spanish handball player
Francisco López (canoeist) (born 1965), Spanish sprint canoer
Francisco López Contardo (born 1975), Chilean motorcycle rider
Francisco López (Chilean hurdler) (born 1995), see 2014 World Junior Championships in Athletics – Men's 110 metres hurdles
Francisco López (Spanish hurdler) (born 1995), see 2014 World Junior Championships in Athletics – Men's 110 metres hurdles
Francisco López (table tennis) (born 1962), Venezuelan table tennis player

Other people
Francisco López de Gómara (c. 1511–c. 1566), Spanish historian at Seville
Francisco López (died 1627), Augustinian friar who translated the Doctrina Christiana and started a dictionary in Ilocano, see Ilocano literature
Francisco López de Zúñiga, 2nd Marquis of Baides (1599–1655), Spanish soldier who served as Royal Governor of Chile, 1639–1646
Francisco Lopez (Passions), a soap opera character from NBC/DirecTV's daytime drama Passions

See also
Francisco Lopes (born 1955), Portuguese politician
Francisco Craveiro Lopes (1894–1964), president of Portugal, 1951–1958